WordWeb is an international English dictionary and thesaurus program for Microsoft Windows, iOS, Android and Mac OS X. It is partly based on the WordNet database.

Functions 
WordWeb usually resides in the Windows' notification area. It can be activated by holding down CTRL and right-clicking a word in almost any program. This opens the WordWeb main window, with definitions. In addition to its dictionary and thesaurus features, it includes:

 Phrase guessing – for example, CTRL + right-clicking 'Princeton' in 'Princeton University' shows the meaning of the combined entity rather than only 'Princeton'.
 Words from pictures – CTRL + right-clicking a word within an image (for example, the 'Free' in the Wikipedia logo) asks WordWeb to guess the word.

Wordweb is used primarily by international students to find out meanings, improve their vocabulary and progress through academic life.

Information 
The thesaurus is integrated into the dictionary. Under each definition, various related words are shown, including:

 Synonyms
 Antonyms
 Hyponyms ('play' lists several sub-types of play, including 'passion play')
 Hypernyms ('daisy' is listed as a type of 'flower') 
 Constituents (under 'forest', listed parts include 'tree' and 'underbrush')
 Words describing things that might be thereby constituted 
 Similar words (words that are not synonyms, but are semantically similar; 'big' is listed as similar to 'huge')

Each shown word can be double-clicked to jump to its entry. WordWeb keeps a history of each session, allowing users to see their previously viewed entries.

Users can also actively improve the dictionary and thesaurus by submitting errors (such as missing words, phrases, or more senses for existing entries) and enhancement requests.

Wordweb is not a social platform in any way.

Versions
There are two WordWeb versions: the free version, which does not have the word list, search, anagram, or customization features; and the paid version, WordWeb Pro.

WordWeb 5 added the ability to list entries from three online sources: Wikipedia, Wiktionary, and WordWeb Online. These details appear in three separate tabs. Version 6 added audio pronunciations and support for third-party Oxford and Chambers add-on dictionaries.

WordWeb 7 was mainly a content upgrade, with revised definition and sound databases, but also had significantly updated one-click support for the latest browsers and 64-bit programs.
Other changes included updated audio pronunciations, improved one-click integration with other programs, better one-click 64-bit and Windows 8 program support, keyboard hotkeys for Bookmark menu items, and auto-detect support for the latest third-party Concise Oxford and Merriam-Webster dictionary add-ons.

As of version 7, WordWeb required Windows XP, Windows Vista, Windows 7, Windows 8, or Windows 10.

WordWeb 8 includes one-click and keyboard lookup, including in Mozilla Thunderbird and Firefox without browser plugins. Support for Windows XP was dropped.

Open-source alternative 
No version of WordWeb (including Pro) is available for Unix, however, it can be used with Wine. Artha, a similar program that includes some of WordWeb Pro's features, is available for both Linux and Windows; a port to Macintosh is promised.

License 
Use of the free version is subject to license terms. However, it may be used by an educational institution (free of cost) for their students, even if they violate said terms.

Regions 
WordWeb is regionalized, with specific dictionaries for Australian, British, Canadian, American, Irish, New Zealand, South African, and Indian English.

References

External links
WordWeb official website 
WordWeb online dictionary (uses the WordWeb database)

Web services
Dictionary software
Pascal (programming language) software